is the first single by Japanese girl group SKE48, their first (and also last) under Lantis. It is an ending theme for Shin Mazinger Shougeki! Z Hen. It reached the 5th place on the weekly Oricon Singles Chart and, as of September 21, 2009 (issue date), has sold 27,295 copies.

This was the only single from SKE48 released by Lantis.

Members 
 Team S: Aki Deguchi, Kanako Hiramatsu, Rikako Hirata, Mizuki Kuwabara, Jurina Matsui, Rena Matsui, Yui Matsushita, Sayuki Mori, Yuka Nakanishi, Haruka Ono, Masana Oya, Rina Shinkai, Shiori Takada, Kumi Yagami, Moe Yamashita, Tsukina Takai

References

2009 debut singles
Japanese-language songs
Songs with lyrics by Yasushi Akimoto
SKE48 songs
Lantis (company) singles
2009 songs